is a Japanese professional wrestler trained by and signed to New Japan Pro-Wrestling (NJPW) where he is a two-time IWGP Tag Team Champion with United Empire teammate Jeff Cobb under the ring name .  He also wrestles for NJPW's United Kingdom based partner promotion Revolution Pro Wrestling (RevPro), where he is the current British Heavyweight Champion in his first reign.

Early life 
Oka excelled in amateur wrestling while in school, winning the All Japan Wrestling Championship in the 120 kg Freestyle class in 2012. Oka met Takaaki Kidani, president of Bushiroad in 2013, and was signed to New Japan Pro-Wrestling (NJPW) shortly after, but didn't begin training until 2015 as he was still in university at the time. Oka is an avid anime fan, citing Milky Holmes as his favourite anime. In the past, Oka has also competed in judo, karate, sambo, kickboxing, pankration, jiu-jitsu and mixed-martial arts.

Professional wrestling career

New Japan Pro-Wrestling

Young Lion (2015–2020) 
Oka began training with New Japan Pro-Wrestling (NJPW) in 2015, and made his in-ring debut on February 25, 2016, wrestling fellow rookie Katsuya Kitamura to a draw in a dark match at Lion's Gate Project 1. Oka and Kitamura wrestled to another draw in a dark match on September 1 at Lion's Gate Project 3. Oka made his televised debut on January 3, 2017, losing to his trainer Yuji Nagata. Oka once again lost to Nagata on January 27, January 31, and February 2. On February 9, Oka, Yoshitatsu and Henare were defeated by Nagata, Hirai Kawato and Jyushin Thunder Liger. Oka's first victory came on February 21, when he defeated Henare via referee stoppage after Henare suffered an ankle injury during their match. On April 13 at Lion's Gate Project 4, he teamed with his trainer Yuji Nagata to defeat Katsuya Kitamura and Manabu Nakanishi. On July 22, he and Nagata defeated Kitamura and Hiroshi Tanahashi. Oka then formed a tag team named "Monster Rage" with Kitamura. From October 12 to December 21, Oka took part in the 2017 Young Lion Cup, where he finished third with a record of three wins and two losses. Oka and Kitamura made their debuts in All Japan Pro Wrestling (AJPW) on July 5, 2017, losing to Wild Burning (Jun Akiyama and Takao Omori).

On June 30, 2018, Oka debuted a new look and ring name, Great-O-Kharn. He defeated Shota Umino with a new finisher, a Mongolian chop delivered from the second turnbuckle. Great O-Kharn started his excursion in the United Kingdom with New Japan affiliate Revolution Pro Wrestling and has started with 3 impressive wins and has since reinvented his finisher into a Crossbow submission. At Revolution Pro Wrestling's Summer Sizzler O-Kharn defeated American Superstar Shane Strickland and continued his winning streak into the Rev Pro tapings. On October 13, 2019, The Great O-Kharn teamed with Rampage Brown to win the RPW Tag Titles. A month later, on November 24, O-Kharn and Brown unified the RPW Tag Titles with the SWE Tag Titles when they defeated The Moonlight Express.

United Empire (2020–present) 
On October 16, 2020, O-Kharn, now going by the slightly modified ring name Great-O-Khan, returned to NJPW during G1 Climax 30, helping Will Ospreay defeat Kazuchika Okada. He joined Ospreay and his girlfriend, Bea Priestley, in a new faction, The Empire. In November 2020, O-Khan and new member of The Empire, Jeff Cobb would enter World Tag League where they finished with a record of 5 wins and 4 losses. The faction would rename itself United Empire in January 2021. O-Khan would wrestle and lose to Hiroshi Tanahashi at Wrestle Kingdom 15. After Tanahashi defeated Shingo Takagi in the main event of The New Beginning in Nagoya to win the NEVER Openweight Championship, O-Khan would attack Tanahashi and then issue a challenge for the following months Castle Attack event. At Castle Attack, Tanahashi would once again defeat O-Khan. In March 2021, O-Khan entered the New Japan Cup for the first time, where he defeated Tetsuya Naito in the first round, but lost to Toru Yano in the second round. Following this O-Khan feuded with Tetsuya Naito culminating in a singles match at the 26th April Road To Wrestling Dontaku event. O-Kahn was defeated by Naito in this match. In September O-Kahn was announced as a participant in G1 Climax 31, his first appearance in the tournament. He finished the tournament with a record of four wins and five defeats, for a total of 8 points. At Power Struggle, O-Khan unsuccessfully challenged Toru Yano in an amateur rules match for the 2021 KOPW provisional championship. O-Khan's 2021 concluded with World Tag League, teaming with Aaron Heanre. The team finished with a score of fourteen points, seven wins and four losses.

O-Khan began 2022 with a loss to Sanada at Wrestle Kingdom 16 in a special singles match. An entrant in the 2022 New Japan Cup, O-Khan was defeated by Zack Sabre Jr. in the third round. On April 9, O-Khan and Cobb became the IWGP Tag-team Champions for the first time in both men's careers, during the Hyper Battle series. The two lost the titles at Wrestling Dontaku, ending their reign at 22 days. They regained the titles on June 12, at Dominion 6.12 in Osaka-jo Hall. After losing the titles at AEW x NJPW: Forbidden Door, O-Khan was announced to be a part of the G1 Climax 32 in July, where he would compete in the B Block. O-Khan finished the tournament with 4 points, failing to advance to the semi-finals.

All Elite Wrestling (2022)

On the May 25th, 2022 episode of AEW Dynamite, O'Khan and Cobb interrupted the ROH World Tag Team Championship match between FTR and Roppongi Vice, attacking both teams and raising the championships, indicating their intentions of challenging for the championships. After both men along with United Empire stablemates Aaron Henare, Kyle Fletcher, Mark Davis and Will Ospreay all attacked both men on the June 15th special Road Rager episode of Dynamite, Ospreay was announced to face Orange Cassidy, whilst O-Khan and Cobb were placed into a triple-threat tag-team Winner Takes All match for their newly won IWGP Tag Team Championships and FTR's ROH World Tag Team Championships, along with Roppongi Vice at AEWxNJPW: Forbidden Door. At the event, Cobb and O-Khan both failed to capture the ROH World Tag Team Titles lost the IWGP Tag Team Titles to FTR.

Personal life

On April 4th, 2022, O-Khan was given a letter of appreciation by Kawasaki City police after saving a teenage girl who had been grabbed by a drunk man at JR Musashi Kosugi Station 6 days ago (March 29th). He displayed the letter during his entrance at his next match, to raise awareness for crime prevention.

Championships and accomplishments
Pro Wrestling Illustrated
 Ranked No. 157 of the top 500 singles wrestlers in the PWI 500 in 2021

New Japan Pro-Wrestling
IWGP Tag Team Championship (2 times) – with Jeff Cobb

Revolution Pro Wrestling
British Heavyweight Championship (1 time, current)
RPW Undisputed British Tag Team Championship (1 time) - with Rampage Brown

Southside Wrestling Entertainment
SWE Tag Team Championship (1 time) - with Rampage Brown

Tokyo Sports
Technique Award (2021)
Fighting Spirit Award (2022)
Best Tag Team Award (2022) – with Jeff Cobb

References

External links 

 

1991 births
Living people
People from Maebashi
Japanese male professional wrestlers
Undisputed British Tag Team Champions
IWGP Heavyweight Tag Team Champions